Governor Middleton may refer to:

Arthur Middleton (1681–1737), Acting Governor of the Province of South Carolina from 1725 to 1730
John Middleton (administrator) (1870–1954), Governor of the Falkland Islands from 1920 to 1927, Governor of The Gambia from 1927 to 1928, and Dominion Governor of Newfoundland from 1928 to 1932
John Middleton, 1st Earl of Middleton (1608–1674), Governor of English Tangier from 1667 to 1674